Teresa "Terri" Hilda Poole, OAM (born 28 January 1964) is an English-born Australian Paralympic tandem cyclist with a vision impairment.  She was born in the English city of Manchester. She competed at the 1996 Atlanta Games, where she won two gold medals in the Women's Individual Pursuit Tandem open and the Women's Kilo Tandem open track cycling events, for which she received a Medal of the Order of Australia. Her pilot was Sandra Smith. She competed in the Women's 50/60k Tandem open event for road cycling but did not medal.

Poole received an Australian Sports Medal in 2000. In 2001, she held five world records in tandem cycling. She was an Australian Institute of Sport scholarship holder in 1996 and 1997.

References

Paralympic cyclists of Australia
Cyclists at the 1996 Summer Paralympics
Medalists at the 1996 Summer Paralympics
Paralympic gold medalists for Australia
Visually impaired category Paralympic competitors
English emigrants to Australia
Sportspeople from Manchester
Australian blind people
Australian Institute of Sport Paralympic cyclists
Recipients of the Medal of the Order of Australia
Recipients of the Australian Sports Medal
1964 births
Living people
Australian female cyclists
Paralympic medalists in cycling